Garcinia maingayi is a species of flowering plant in the family Clusiaceae. It is a tree found in Peninsular Malaysia and Borneo.

References

maingayi
Trees of Peninsular Malaysia
Trees of Borneo
Flora of Sarawak
Least concern plants
Taxonomy articles created by Polbot
Taxa named by Joseph Dalton Hooker